The Glockenmuseum Stiftskirche Herrenberg English: Museum of Bells in the Collegiate Church of Herrenberg) is a museum in the bell tower of Herrenberg's main church. More than 35 of the bells in the collection are still in use, some of them are more than 1,000 years old. There is also a Carillon with 50 bells.

It is the most extensive collection of bells that are still in use in the world.

Guided tours are given, in English and German.

Pictures
For high quality zoomable 360°-pictures of the exposition visit www.glockenmuseum-stiftskirche-herrenberg.de/fuehrung.

See also 
 List of music museums

References

External links
 English information
 official website (german)

Carillons
Music museums in Germany
Museums in Baden-Württemberg
Bell ringing organizations